James McCabe (born 5 July 2003) is a Filipino-born Australian tennis player.

McCabe has a career high ATP singles ranking of 546 achieved on 4 April 2022. He also has a career high ATP doubles ranking of 1204 achieved on 17 January 2022.

McCabe made his Grand Slam main draw debut at the 2022 Australian Open after receiving a wildcard into the doubles main draw with Alex Bolt.

ATP Challenger and World Tennis Tour finals

Singles: 2 (0–2)

References

External links

2003 births
Living people
Australian male tennis players